Francesco Suppo (7 September 1915 – 5 August 1995) was an Italian wrestler. He competed in the men's Greco-Roman bantamweight at the 1948 Summer Olympics.

References

External links
 

1915 births
1995 deaths
Italian male sport wrestlers
Olympic wrestlers of Italy
Wrestlers at the 1948 Summer Olympics
Sportspeople from the Province of Savona
20th-century Italian people